Henri Markovich Reznik, also Genri Reznik (born 11 May 1938, in Leningrad) is a prominent Russian lawyer, former criminal investigator and criminologist. He chaired the presidium of the Moscow City Bar Association.

Reznik was teaching Kutafin Moscow State Law University since 2009. He left in 2017 after the University installed a plaque memorializing Stalin.

References

External links
 Биография
 Постановление Европейского суда по правам человека по делу «Резник против России» (№ 4977/05)

1938 births
Living people
Soviet Jews
Russian Jews
Lawyers from Moscow
Moscow Helsinki Group
Russian human rights activists
Members of the Civic Chamber of the Russian Federation
Soviet lawyers
Al-Farabi Kazakh National University alumni